K3 Television (Macedonian Cyrillic: К3 Телевизиjа) was a regional Television channel in Northeast part of North Macedonia, with headquarters in Kumanovo. It started to operate in 2015.

Line up
 News (Macedonian Cyrillic: Вести)

See also
 Kumanovo

References

External links
  YouTube channel

Television channels in North Macedonia
Publicly funded broadcasters
Television channels and stations established in 2015
2015 establishments in the Republic of Macedonia
Mass media in Kumanovo